Beaver Bay Township is a township in Lake County, Minnesota, United States. The population was 517 at the 2020 census.

State Highways 1 and 61 are two of the main routes in the township.

Beaver Bay Township was organized in 1885, and named after Beaver Bay, Minnesota.

Geography

Demographics

As of the census of 2020, the population was 517 people, 400 households residing in the township. The population density was 2.5 people per square mile. There were 456 housing units at an average density with 95% owner occupied and 58% vacant. The racial makeup of the township was 94% White, 5% Hispanic and 1% from two or more races.

Of the 193 households, 76% of were married couples living together, 8% had a female householder and 15% were non-families. The average household size was 1.8 persons per household.

The median age was 63.7 years and 51% of the population was age18-64. 1% of the population were under 18 years of age, 51% from 18 40n 64 years of age and 48% were 65 years of age or older.  For every 100 females, there were 104.9 males. The population was 56% female and 44% male.

The median household income was $84,861 and the median per capita income was $51,144.  About 5.5% of people were below the poverty line, including 5.3% 8% of those age 65 or over.

References

Townships in Lake County, Minnesota
Townships in Minnesota